Aequorivita capsosiphonis  is a Gram-negative and aerobic bacterium from the genus of Aequorivita which has been isolated from the alga Capsosiphon fulvescens from the South Sea in Korea.

References

External links
Type strain of Aequorivita capsosiphonis at BacDive -  the Bacterial Diversity Metadatabase	

Flavobacteria
Bacteria described in 2009